{{Infobox person
| name               = Christian Serratos
| image              = Christian Serratos by Gage Skidmore.jpg
| caption            = Serratos at the 2016 San Diego Comic-Con International
| birth_name         = Christian Marie Bernardi
| birth_date         = 
| birth_place        = Pasadena, California, U.S.
| occupation         = Actress
| yearsactive        = 2004–present
| known_for          = Ned's Declassified School Survival Guideas Suzie CrabgrassThe Walking Deadas Rosita Espinosa
Twilight as Angela Weber Selena: The Seriesas Selena Quintanilla
| partner        = David Boyd (2014-present)
| children           = 1
}}
Christian Marie Serratos (born Bernardi on September 21, 1990) is an American actress who played Rosita Espinosa in AMC's The Walking Dead TV series, based on the comic book of the same name. She is also known for playing Suzie Crabgrass in the Nickelodeon series Ned's Declassified School Survival Guide and Angela Weber in The Twilight Saga. From 2020 to 2021, she portrayed The Queen of Tejano singer Selena in Netflix's Selena: The Series.

Early life
Serratos was born in Pasadena, California, and raised in Burbank, California.Tribute: Christian Serratos Biography March 30, 2014 Her mother was of Mexican descent; while her father was of Italian descent. At the age of 3, she worked as an extra on The Drew Carey Show and Coach. 

She began figure skating at age three and continued competitively, saying, "My coaches were talking about the Olympics and it was really crazy. Now, I just do it for fun." At the age of seven, she signed with the Ford Modeling Agency.

Career
Serratos played Suzie Crabgrass in the Nickelodeon series Ned's Declassified School Survival Guide, which debuted in 2004 and ended in 2007 after three seasons.

Serratos's role as Angela Weber in Twilight won her the "Young Supporting Actress" award in the Best Performance in a Feature Film category at the 30th Young Artist Awards. Serratos reprised the role in the sequels The Twilight Saga: New Moon and The Twilight Saga: Eclipse. In 2011, she appeared in The Black Keys video for their song "Howlin' for You".

Serratos played Rosita Espinosa in AMC's series The Walking Dead, initially as a recurring character in the fourth season where she made her first appearance at the end of the tenth episode "Inmates". Her character was promoted to series regular in the fifth season, and was added to the series' main credits in the seventh season. On September 22, 2022, it was reported that Christian Serratos has been cast in the lead role of the HBO Max drama More playing Londyn Lorenz. 

Appearances
She ranked at No. 65 on Maxims "Hot 100" list for 2010. In the March 2015 issue of Playboy'' magazine, Serratos was featured in the "Becoming Attractions" section.

Personal life
Serratos is an animal rights activist. She has posed for a number of PETA campaigns promoting a vegan lifestyle. She is a vegan.

Christian is married to David Boyd, a singer-songwriter. They have one daughter, born 2017.

Filmography

Film

Television

Music videos

Awards and nominations

References

External links

 
 
 MTV.com interview (Oct 2008)

1990 births
21st-century American actresses
American child actresses
American film actresses
American actresses of Mexican descent
American television actresses
Living people
Actresses from Pasadena, California
Actresses from Los Angeles
American people of Italian descent
American people of Mexican descent
American people of Irish descent
Hispanic and Latino American actresses
Actresses from Burbank, California